The Tatarka is a river in Perm Krai, Russia, a right bank tributary of the Babka, which in turn is a tributary of the Sylva.

References 

Rivers of Perm Krai